The 1997 Skate Israel was the 3rd edition of a senior-level international figure skating competition held in Metulla, Israel. It was held at the Canada Centre. Skaters competed in the disciplines of men's singles, ladies' singles, pair skating, and ice dancing.

Results

Men

Ladies

Pairs

Ice dancing

 WD = Withdrawn

External links
 results
 Skate Israel at the Israel Ice Skating Federation

Skate Israel
Israel
Skate Israel